The Driving Louis Bellson (also released as The Hawk Talks) is an album by American jazz drummer Louis Bellson featuring performances recorded in 1955 for the Norgran label.

Reception
AllMusic awarded the album 3 stars.

Track listing
All compositions by Louis Bellson, except as indicated.
 "Basie" - 6:18
 "Charlie O" - 4:47
 "All Right" (Benny Goodman) - 5:14
 "The Hawk Talks" - 3:52
 "Festivale" - 4:08
 "Greetings" - 5:10
 "Mambo a la Louis Bellson" (Ralph Martin, Mike Alexander) - 3:59

Personnel
Louis Bellson – drums
Charlie Shavers - trumpet (tracks 1-3 & 6)
Nate Brown - flute  (tracks 4, 5 & 7)
Sid Brown - bass clarinet (tracks 4, 5 & 7)
Seldon Powell - tenor saxophone (tracks 1-3 & 6)
Lou Stein - piano 
Wendell Marshall – bass
Sabu Martinez - congas, bongos (tracks 4, 5 & 7)
Alexander Delannay, Cyril Jackson, Joe Comadore - congas (tracks 4, 5 & 7)
Mike Alexander, Rod Clavery, Alfonso Marshall - congas, steel drums (tracks 4, 5 & 7)

References

1955 albums
Verve Records albums
Norgran Records albums
Louie Bellson albums
Albums produced by Norman Granz